Vindula arsinoe, the cruiser, is a butterfly from the family Nymphalidae. It ranges from the Maluku Islands and New Guinea to the Solomon Islands and Queensland. It is sexually dimorphic.

Subspecies
Listed alphabetically:
 V. a. ada (Butler, 1874) – (Banks Island, Cape York - Mackay)
 V. a. adina (Fruhstorfer, 1906) – (Waigeu)
 V. a. arsinoe (Cramer, [1777]) – (Ambon, Serang, Saparua)
 V. a. bosnikensis (Joicey & Noakes, 1915) – (Biak)
 V. a. catenes (Godman & Salvin, 1888) – (Solomons (Santa Anna Island))
 V. a. clodia (Godman & Salvin, 1888) – (Solomons (Ulana Island))
 V. a. dampierensis (Rothschild, 1915) – (Dampier Island)
 V. a. figalea (Fruhstorfer, 1904) – (Obi)
 V. a. insularis (Godman & Salvin, 1877) – (New Britain, Duke of York group)
 V. a. lemina (Ribbe, 1898) – (New Ireland)
 V. a. meforica (Fruhstorfer, 1906) – (Noemfoor Island)
 V. a. melena (Fruhstorfer, 1899) – (New Ireland)
 V. a. moluccana Nieuwenhuis – (northern Moluccas?)
 V. a. pisidike (Fruhstorfer, 1903) – (Fergusson, Goodenough, Normanby Island)
 V. a. polykaste (Fruhstorfer, 1903) – (Trobriand Island)
 V. a. rebeli (Fruhstorfer, 1906) – (West Irian - Papua)
 V. a. rookiana (Strand, 1916) – (Rook Island)

References

External links
Vindula arsinoe ada, Cruiser butterfly, Natural History Museum
Vindula arsinoe ada, Australian Biological Resources Study
Vindula arsinoe, James Cook University

Vagrantini
Butterflies described in 1777